Khortytsia is the largest island on the Dnieper river, and is  long and up to  wide. The island forms part of the Khortytsia National Park. This historic site is located within the city limits of Zaporizhzhia, Ukraine.

The island has played an important role in the history of Ukraine, especially in the history of the Zaporozhian Cossacks. The island has unique flora and fauna, including oak groves, spruce woods, meadows, and steppe.

Geography and location

Zaporizhzhia (direct translation is "beyond the rapids") takes its name from a geographic area downstream of the Dnieper river past the ninth rapid (see Dnieper Rapids). In the 1930s when the Dnieper Hydroelectric Station was built, these rapids were flooded.

On Khortytsia at Savutyn summit, near a ravine of the same name, are three  electrical transmission towers, called Zaporizhzhia Pylon Triple, which are part of a 150 kV powerline crossing the Dnieper river.

History
Khortytsia has been continuously inhabited during the last five millennia. Other islands in the immediate vicinity also contain indications of intensive occupation during the Proto-Indo-European and Scythian periods. The island of Small Khortytsia is known for its Scythian remains and a derelict Cossack fortress. The islet of Sredeny Stih (to the northeast of Khortytsia), excavated during construction of the hydroelectric station in 1927, gave its name to the Sredny Stog culture.

In the Early Middle Ages, Khortytsia was a key centre for the trade route from the Varangians to the Greeks. In his treatise De Administrando Imperio, Emperor Constantine VII mentions the island of St. George immediately downstream from the rapids. He reports that, while passing through the rapids, the Rus would be easy prey for the nomadic Pechenegs. The Kiev Rus' prince Svyatoslav I was attacked and killed during his attempt to cross the rapids in 972.

The earliest record about a stronghold known as a sich refers to the one was located on the island of Small Khortytsia (Mala Khortytsia Island) and was established by the Volhynian prince Dmytro Vyshnevetsky. The Small Khortytsia Island is 20 times smaller than Khortytsia itself. The first Khortytsia Sich existed six years (1552–1558). There are a few other locations downstream past the rapids (Zaporozhia area) where the Zaporizhian Sich was located. 

There are eight of them: Bazavluk (1593–1630), Mykytyn (1628–1652), Chortomlyk (1652–1709), Kamin (1709–1711), Oleshkiv (1711–1734), Pidpilna (1734–1775). All these places were at river crossings. The uprising led by Bohdan Khmelnytsky was started at the Mykytyn Sich in 1648. Legends state that Cossacks wrote the notorious Reply of the Zaporozhian Cossacks to Sultan Mehmed IV of the Ottoman Empire on Khortytsia.

In 1775, the Sich was destroyed by the Russian general Tekhely on the order of Catherine II, resulting in the displacement of Zaporozhian Cossacks, many of whom eventually settled on the Kuban river in the Caucasus area. These Cossacks became known as Kuban cossacks. A part of the Zaporozhian Cossacks escaped to beyond the Danube to become vassals of the Ottoman Sultan. They dwelt at the mouth of the Danube river. 

In 1830, many of these Cossacks moved and established a new sich on the Azov sea shore (between Mariupol and Berdiansk). The last Koshevoy Ataman (leader) of Zaporozhian Sich, Petro Kalnyshevsky, was imprisoned at Solovetsky Island Monastery at the age of 85. After 25 years in prison he was released and died almost blind at the monastery at the age of 113 years.

In 1789, Mennonites from the Baltic port city of Gdańsk (Danzig) were invited by the tsar to form settlements on the vast steppes of the Russian Empire. One of these settlements was located on the island of Khortytsia. They farmed on the rich island soil. Some of their profitable business was trade in lumber from the Khortytsia groves and woods. In 1916 the Mennonite colonists sold Khortytsia Island to the Alexandrovsk city council (see Chortitza Colony).

In 1965, Khortytsia Island was "proclaimed a historical and cultural reserve". The Dnieper Rapids state historical and cultural reserve was established in 1974; this included both Khortytsia Island, adjacent islands and rocks, and part of the right bank of the Dnieper. The reserve was given national status in 1993.

National Reserve

The major part of the reserve (historic park) covers the Zaporizhian Cossack Museum that includes the Cossack horse show. The museum building is modern, nestling low in the landscape with dramatic views of the Dnieper Hydroelectric Station to the north. The museum was opened in October 1983, as the Museum of Zaporizhzhia History. The museum project was approved by the Ministry of Culture and Derzhbud of Ukraine in December 1970.

There were four dioramas: "Battle of Sviatoslav at rapids" (author M. Oviechkin), "Uprising of the impoverished cossacks at Zaporizhian Sich in 1768" (M. Oviechkin), "Construction of Dnieper HES" (V. Trotsenko), "Night storm of Zaporizhzhia city in October 1943" (M. Oviechkin). Part of the museum became the Zaporizhzhian Oak located at the Upper Khortytsia. In 1992 the exposition of the museum was redesigned.

The museum contains exhibits dating from the Stone Age through the Scythian period down to the 20th century.

See also
Khortytsia District
Russian Mennonite

Bibliography

References

External links

Official website of Khortytsia National Reserve
Official website of Historic Cultural Complex Zaporizhian Sich
website of Lapidarium

Neighborhoods of Zaporizhzhia
River islands of Ukraine
Open-air museums in Ukraine
Zaporozhian Sich historic sites
Viking Age populated places
Former populated places in Eastern Europe
Historic sites in Ukraine
Protected areas of Ukraine
Protected areas established in 1983
Museums in Zaporizhzhia Oblast
History of Zaporizhzhia
Forts in Ukraine
Former German settlements in Zaporizhzhia Oblast
Islands of the Dnieper